Bommen is an islet west of Langåra in Tiholmane, part of Thousand Islands, an archipelago south of Edgeøya. At low water it is connected with Langåra, creating a bar that partially blocks access to Tofamnhamna (Two Fathoms Bay), the anchorage within Langåra, Kalvøya, Lurøya, Sperra, Bommen and Spunset.

References 

 Norwegian Polar Institute Place Names of Svalbard Database

Islands of Svalbard